Reinhard Kleist (born 11 February 1970, Hürth, Germany) is a German graphic designer and cartoonist.

Life
Kleist studied graphic design at the Fachhochschule Münster. There he created his albums "Lovecraft," "Dorian" and as a thesis "Abenteur eines Weichenstellers". After finishing his degree he moved to Berlin. In 1996, at the International Comics Salon in Erlangen, he won the Max-and-Moritz-Prize for the best German-language Comic Album. Since 2003 he has been working together with author Tobias O. Meißner on the comics series "Berlinoir," which is published with Edition 52.

In September 2006, Kleist's biography on Elvis Presley was released with the title "Elvis." In 2008, Kleist learned Spanish to travel to Cuba, where he drew and sketched street scenes from Havana, which he compiled in the graphic novel "Havanna" in 2007. 

In 2011, his book "Der Boxer" (The Boxer) was released, which tells the story of Jewish Boxer Harry Haft. Kleist's graphic novel about the Somali runner Samia Yusuf Omar was published in 2015 under the title "Der Traum von Olympia" (The Dream of Olympia). Several of his books have been translated into English, French or Arabic.

Selected works
 Minna. 1994
 Lovecraft. 1994
 Das Festmahl. 1995
 Dorian. 1996
 Amerika. 1998
 Fucked. 2000
 Steeplechase. 2001
 Paul. 2001
 Das Grauen im Gemäuer. 2002
 Berlinoir. Band 1: Scherbenmund. 
 Berlinoir. Band 2: Mord! 2004
 Cash – I See a Darkness. 2006
 ELVIS – Die illustrierte Biographie. 2007
 The Secrets of Coney Island. 2007
 Berlinoir. Band 3: Narbenstadt. 2008
 Havanna. 2008
 Castro. 2010
 Der Boxer. Die wahre Geschichte des Hertzko Haft. Carlsen, Hamburg 2011, . (Translated into English in 2014)
 Reinhard Osteroth, Text: 1914. Ein Maler zieht in den Krieg. Aladin Verlag, Hamburg 2014, 
 Der Traum von Olympia. Die Geschichte von Samia Yusuf Omar. Carlsen, Hamburg 2015, 
 Nick Cave: Mercy on Me, 2017 — a graphic biography of musician Nick Cave

References

1970 births
Living people
German graphic designers
German cartoonists
German comics artists